Tesa SE is a German company manufacturing adhesive products. Founded in 2001, the company was previously a division of Beiersdorf, remaining a subsidiary thereof after becoming an independent company. In Germany, the brand name has become synonymous with adhesive tape, and is listed in the Duden dictionary as such. In addition to its consumer adhesive tapes, the company also supplies adhesives to other industries. Clients include Apple and Samsung, for whom Tesa supplies adhesives to build smartphones and tablet computers, as well as the car industry, where the company provides adhesives for a wide range of applications like windows, sensors and displays.

References

Beiersdorf brands
Chemical companies established in 2001
Chemical companies of Germany
German brands
German companies established in 2001